Carcass or Carcase (both pronounced ) may refer to:
Dressed carcass, the body of a livestock animal ready for butchery, after removal of skin, visceral organs, head, feet etc.
Carrion, the decaying dead body of an animal or human being
The structural system or frame of a structure, especially one not normally seen
Carcass saw, a type of backsaw

Arts and entertainment
Carcass (band), a British extreme metal band
Carcass (G.I. Joe), a fictional character
Have His Carcase, a British crime novel

Military
Carcass (projectile), a type of incendiary ammunition designed to be fired from a cannon
, three ships of the Royal Navy
Carcass, in the US Navy, a repairable component that is Depot Level Repairable (DLR), but Not Ready-For-Issue (NRFI)

Places
Carcass Island, one of the Falkland Islands
Krkavče, a village in Slovenia

See also
Cadaver (disambiguation)
Carrion (disambiguation)
Corpse (disambiguation)